Oberricken Pass (el. 906 m.) is a mountain pass in the canton of St. Gallen in Switzerland. It connects the lower Ricken Pass with the villages Walde and Rüeterswil, in the municipality St. Gallenkappel.

References

Mountain passes of Switzerland
Mountain passes of the canton of St. Gallen